Ozyptila is a genus of crab spiders that was first described by Eugène Louis Simon in 1864. It has been misspelled as "Oxyptila" in multiple accounts.

Species
 it contains 101 species and four subspecies, found in Africa, Europe, North America, and Asia:

O. aculeipes Strand, 1906 – Tunisia
O. aculipalpa Wunderlich, 1995 – Iran
O. americana Banks, 1895 – USA, Canada
O. amkhasensis Tikader, 1980 – India
O. ankarensis Karol, 1966 – Turkey
O. annulipes (Lucas, 1846) – Algeria
O. arctica Kulczyński, 1908 – North America, Northern Europe, Russia (Europe to Far East)
O. aspex Pavesi, 1895 – Ethiopia
O. atlantica Denis, 1963 – Canary Is., Salvages
O. atomaria (Panzer, 1801) – Europe, Turkey, Caucasus, Russia (Europe to Far East), Kazakhstan, Iran, Central Asia, China, Korea, Japan
O. balcanica Deltshev, Blagoev, Komnenov & Lazarov, 2016 – North Macedonia, Bulgaria, Greece
O. barbara Denis, 1945 – Algeria
O. beaufortensis Strand, 1916 – USA, Canada
O. bejarana Urones, 1998 – Spain, France
O. biprominula Tang & Li, 2010 – China
O. brevipes (Hahn, 1826) – Europe, Russia (Europe to South Siberia)
O. caenosa Jézéquel, 1966 – Ivory Coast
O. callitys (Thorell, 1875) – Tunisia
O. chandosiensis Tikader, 1980 – India
O. claveata (Walckenaer, 1837) (type) – Europe, Turkey, Iran
O. clavidorsa Roewer, 1959 – Turkey
O. clavigera (O. Pickard-Cambridge, 1872) – Israel
O. confluens (C. L. Koch, 1845) – Southern Europe, Syria
O. conostyla Hippa, Koponen & Oksala, 1986 – Turkey to Turkmenistan
O. conspurcata Thorell, 1877 – USA, Canada
O. creola Gertsch, 1953 – USA
O. curvata Dondale & Redner, 1975 – USA, Canada
O. dagestana Ponomarev & Dvadnenko, 2011 – Russia (Europe)
O. danubiana Weiss, 1998 – Romania, Greece
O. distans Dondale & Redner, 1975 – USA, Canada
O. elegans (Blackwall, 1870) – Italy
O. flava Simon, 1875 – Spain
O. formosa Bryant, 1930 – USA
O. fukushimai Ono, 2002 – Japan
O. furcula L. Koch, 1882 – Spain (mainland, Balearic Is.), France
O. fusca (Grube, 1861) – Russia (eastern Siberia)
O. gasanensis Paik, 1985 – Korea
O. georgiana Keyserling, 1880 – USA, Canada
O. gertschi Kurata, 1944 – North America, Europe, Russia (Far East)
O. geumoensis Seo & Sohn, 1997 – Korea
O. grisea Roewer, 1955 – Iran, Afghanistan
O. hardyi Gertsch, 1953 – USA
O. imbrex Tang & Li, 2010 – China
O. inaequalis (Kulczyński, 1901) – Russia (Europe to South Siberia), Kazakhstan, Mongolia, China
O. inglesi Schick, 1965 – USA
O. jabalpurensis Bhandari & Gajbe, 2001 – India
O. jeholensis Saito, 1936 – China
O. judaea Levy, 1975 – Israel
O. kaszabi Marusik & Logunov, 2002 – Mongolia, China
O. khasi Tikader, 1961 – India
O. ladina Thaler & Zingerle, 1998 – Italy
O. laevis Denis, 1954 – Morocco
O. leprieuri Simon, 1875 – Morocco, Algeria, Malta?
O. lugubris (Kroneberg, 1875) – Eastern Europe, Caucasus, Russia (Europe to West Siberia), Kazakhstan, Iran, Central Asia
O. lutosa Ono & Martens, 2005 – Iran
O. maculosa Hull, 1948 – Britain
O. makidica Ono & Martens, 2005 – Iran
O. manii Tikader, 1961 – India
O. maratha Tikader, 1971 – India
O. matsumotoi Ono, 1988 – Japan
O. metschensis Strand, 1906 – Ethiopia, East Africa
O. mingrelica Mcheidze, 1971 – Georgia
O. monroensis Keyserling, 1884 – USA, Canada
O. nigristerna Dalmas, 1922 – Italy
O. nipponica Ono, 1985 – China, Korea, Japan
O. nongae Paik, 1974 – Russia (Far East), China, Korea, Japan
O. numida (Lucas, 1846) – Algeria
O. omega Levy, 1975 – Israel
O. orientalis Kulczyński, 1926 – Russia (South Siberia to Far East), Mongolia, China
Ozyptila o. balkarica Ovtsharenko, 1979 – Caucasus (Russia, Georgia)
Ozyptila o. basegica Esyunin, 1992 – Russia (Urals)
O. pacifica Banks, 1895 – USA, Canada
O. panganica Caporiacco, 1947 – East Africa
O. parvimana Simon, 1886 – Senegal
O. patellibidens Levy, 1999 – Israel
O. pauxilla (Simon, 1870) – Western Mediterranean
O. perplexa Simon, 1875 – Portugal, Spain, France, Algeria
O. praticola (C. L. Koch, 1837) – North America, Europe, Turkey, Caucasus, Russia (Europe to South Siberia), Kazakhstan, Iran, Central Asia
O. pullata (Thorell, 1875) – Europe
O. rauda Simon, 1875 – Europe, Turkey, Caucasus, Russia (Europe to South Siberia, Kamchatka), Kazakhstan, Iran
O. reenae Basu, 1964 – India
O. rigida (O. Pickard-Cambridge, 1872) – Israel, Saudi Arabia, Azerbaijan
O. sakhalinensis Ono, Marusik & Logunov, 1990 – Russia (Far East), Japan
O. salustri Wunderlich, 2011 – Italy
O. sanctuaria (O. Pickard-Cambridge, 1871) – Europe
O. scabricula (Westring, 1851) – Europe, Caucasus, Russia (Europe to Far East), Central Asia, China, Korea
O. secreta Thaler, 1987 – Switzerland, Italy
O. sedotmikha Levy, 2007 – Israel
O. shuangqiaoensis Yin, Peng, Gong & Kim, 1999 – China
O. simplex (O. Pickard-Cambridge, 1862) – Europe, Turkey, Russia (Europe to Middle Siberia), Iran
O. sincera Kulczyński, 1926 – Russia (Europe to Far East), Korea, Japan
Ozyptila s. canadensis Dondale & Redner, 1975 – USA, Canada
Ozyptila s. oraria Dondale & Redner, 1975 – USA
O. spinosissima Caporiacco, 1934 – Karakorum
O. spirembola Wunderlich, 1995 – Turkey
O. tenerifensis Wunderlich, 1992 – Canary Is.
O. theobaldi Simon, 1885 – India
O. tricoloripes Strand, 1913 – Turkey, Israel, Iran, Azerbaijan, Turkmenistan, Kazakhstan
O. trux (Blackwall, 1846) – Europe, Caucasus, Russia (Europe to Far East), Japan. Introduced to Canada
O. umbraculorum Simon, 1932 – Portugal, Spain, France
O. utotchkini Marusik, 1990 – Russia (Far East), Korea
O. varica Simon, 1875 – Algeria
O. westringi (Thorell, 1873) – Sweden, Netherlands, Germany
O. wuchangensis Tang & Song, 1988 – China
O. yosemitica Schick, 1965 – USA

See also
 List of Thomisidae species

References

 
Araneomorphae genera
Spiders of Africa
Spiders of Asia
Spiders of North America
Thomisidae